Avay Shukla is a retired IAS (Indian Administrative Service) officer, an environmentalist and a writer. He obtained his Master's degree (English) from Hindu College, Delhi, in 1973, and taught for two years at Delhi University before joining the Indian Administrative Service in 1975. Serving in Delhi and Himachal Pradesh in various capacities, he retired in December 2010, completing his official duties as Additional Chief Secretary of Himachal Pradesh.

He is President of the HP Trekking Association and is one of the founding members of the Eco-Tourism Society of India.

He has settled in a village, Puranikoti, above Shimla and divides his time between that and Delhi. He has two sons, Sidharth (a digital media executive with a multi-national company) and Saurabh (a finance and investment consultant) with his wife Neerja, a special educator who manages her own NGO working with children who are mentally and physically challenged.

Bibliography 

Avay Shukla writes extensively on current affairs, the environment and conservation, the bureaucracy and governance, legal matters, social issues, societal peccadilloes and more. His work has been published in The New Indian Express, The Times of India, The Hindustan Times, The Tribune, National Herald, The Morning Standard and on websites such as Sify.com, The Wire, The Citizen and Hillpost.com.

Books 

 The Trails Less Travelled: Trekking the Himachal Himalayas
 The Spectre of Choor Dhar: Tales from the Mountains
PolyTicks, DeMocKrazy & MumboJumbo: Babus, Mantris and Netas (Un)Making Our Nation
India: The Wasted Years

References

External links 

 http://avayshukla.blogspot.com/

Living people
21st-century Indian writers
Indian travel writers
Indian environmentalists
Indian Administrative Service officers
Year of birth missing (living people)